The Satavahanas (Sādavāhana or Sātavāhana,), also referred to as the Andhras in the Puranas, were an ancient Indian dynasty based in the Deccan region. Most modern scholars believe that the Satavahana rule began in the late second century BCE and lasted until the early third century CE, although some assign the beginning of their rule to as early as the 3rd century BCE based on the Puranas, but uncorroborated by archaeological evidence. The Satavahana kingdom mainly comprised the present-day Andhra Pradesh, Telangana, and Maharashtra. At different times, their rule extended to parts of modern Gujarat, Madhya Pradesh, and Karnataka. The dynasty had different capital cities at different times, including Pratishthana (Paithan) and Amaravati (Dharanikota).

The origin of the dynasty is uncertain, but according to the Puranas, their first king overthrew the Kanva dynasty. In the post-Maurya era, the Satavahanas established peace in the Deccan region and resisted the onslaught of foreign invaders. In particular their struggles with the Saka Western Satraps went on for a long time. The dynasty reached its zenith under the rule of Gautamiputra Satakarni and his successor Vasisthiputra Pulamavi. The kingdom had fragmented into smaller states by the early 3rd century CE.

The Satavahanas were early issuers of Indian state coinage struck with images of their rulers. They formed a cultural bridge and played a vital role in trade and the transfer of ideas and culture to and from the Indo-Gangetic Plain to the southern tip of India. They supported Hinduism as well as Buddhism and patronised Prakrit literature.

Origins 

The date and place of origin of the Satavahanas, as well as the meaning of the dynasty's name, are a matter of debate among historians. Some of these debates have happened in the context of regionalism, with the present-day  Maharashtra, Andhra Pradesh, Karnataka and Telangana being variously claimed as the original homeland of the Satavahanas.

Etymology 

According to one theory, the word "Satavahana" (Brahmi script:  Sādavāhana or  Sātavāhana,) is a Prakrit form of the Sanskrit Sapta-Vahana ("driven by seven"; in Hindu mythology, the chariot of the sun god is drawn by seven horses). This would indicate that the Satavahanas originally claimed association with the legendary solar dynasty, as was common in ancient India. According to Inguva Kartikeya Sarma, the dynasty's name is derived from the words sata ("sharpened", "nimble" or "swift") and vahana ("vehicle"); the expression thus means "one who rides a nimble horse". Saatakarni means one who possesses capability of "lion ears". Saatavahana means one who uses Lion as his vehicle.

Another theory connects their name to the earlier Satiyaputa dynasty. Yet another theory derives their name from the Munda words Sadam ("horse") and Harpan ("son"), implying "son of the performer of a horse sacrifice". Several rulers of the dynasty bear the name or title "Satakarni". Satavahana, Satakarni, Satakani and Shalivahana appear to be variations of the same word. Damodar Dharmanand Kosambi theorised that the word "Satakarni" is derived from the Munda words sada ("horse") and kon ("son").

The Puranas use the name "Andhra" for the Satavahanas. The term "Andhra" may refer to the ethnicity or territory of the dynasty (see Original homeland below). It does not appear in the dynasty's own records.

Tamil epic Silappatikaram mentions a "Nurruvar Kannar", who helped Chera king Senguttuvan during his Himalaya campaign. The direct translation of the term Nurruvar Kannar is "the hundred Karnas" or "Satakarni", hence the Nurruvar Kannar has been identified with the Satavahana dynasty.

The Kathasaritsagara ascribes a mythical etymology in which a widowed, childless king named Deepakarni was prophesied to find a lion-riding child as his heir. During a jungle hunt, he found such a child riding a yaksha-turned-lion named Sāta. After adoption, the child became the king eventually and came to be known as Sātavāhana or Sāta-supported.

Original homeland 

The use of the names "Andhra" and "Andhra-Jatiya" in the Puranas has led some scholars, such as E.J Rapson and R.G Bhandarkar, to believe that the dynasty originated in the eastern Deccan region (the historic Andhra region, present-day Andhra Pradesh and Telangana). At Kotilingala in Telangana, coins bearing the legend "Rano Siri Chimuka Satavahanasa" were found. Epigraphist and numismatist P. V. P. Sastry initially identified Chimuka with the dynasty's founder Simuka, Coins attributed to Simuka's successors Kanha and Satakarni I were also discovered at Kotilingla. Based on these discoveries, historians such as Ajay Mitra Shastri, D. R. Reddy, S. Reddy, and Shankar R. Goyal theorised that Kotlingala was the original home of the Satavahanas. Ajay Mitra Shastri stated that the finding of the coins at Kotilinga give "a clear pointer to the region where we have to locate the original center of the Satavahana political authority." However, the coin samples from Kotlingala are small, and it is not certain if these coins were minted there or reached there from somewhere else. Moreover, the identification of Chimuka of Kotilingala with the dynasty's founder Simuka has been contested by several scholars including P. L. Gupta and I. K. Sarma, who identified Chimuka as a later ruler. P.V.P. Sastry also later changed his view and stated that the two kings were different. In addition to the Kotilinga find, a coin of the Satavahana prince Saktikumara, who was in the fourth generation of the founder, has been reported as a stratified find from the Kurnool district of Andhra Pradesh. As for the Puranas, these texts could have been compiled at a later date and it is not certain if the Satavahanas were referred to as Andhras during their time.

Andhra tribes were known to be living near Yamuna river bank during 700 BCE and "Apastamba" who is author of Apastamba Dharmasutra was their preacher. They started moving south and initially settled south of Vindhya Mountains.
They established Kingdoms. Built Several Cities. These cities are widely spread between present South Maharashtra and Andhra Pradesh states.Paithan (Prathishtanapuram) was their capital. They are Satavahana Kings. It was mentioned, described by Megasthenes during Chandragupta Maurya reign in his book Indica.

Another section of scholars believe that the Satavahanas originated in western Deccan (present-day Maharashtra). All four extant inscriptions from the early Satavahana period (c. 1st century BCE) have been found in and around this region. One of the earliest known Satavahana inscriptions was that found at Cave No.19 of the Pandavleni Caves in Nashik district, which was issued during the reign of Kanha (100-70 BCE). An inscription found at Naneghat was issued by Nayanika (or Naganika), the widow of Satakarni I; another inscription found at Naneghat has been dated to the same period on a paleographic basis. A slightly later inscription dated to the reign of Satakarni II has been found at Sanchi in Madhya Pradesh, located to the north of Maharashtra. The majority of the other Satavahana inscriptions have also been found in western Deccan. On the other hand, the epigraphic evidence from eastern Deccan does not mention the Satavahanas before the 4th century CE. At Nevasa, a seal and coins attributed to Kanha have been discovered. Coins attributed to Satakarni I have also been discovered at Nashik, Nevasa, and Pauni in Maharashtra (besides places in eastern Deccan and present-day Madhya Pradesh). Based on this evidence, some historians argue that the Satavahanas initially came to power in the area around their capital Pratishthana (modern Paithan, Maharashtra) and then expanded their territory to eastern Deccan. Carla Sinopoli cautions that the inference about the western Deccan origin of the Satavahanas is "tentative at best" given the small sample of early inscriptions.

Kanha's Pandavleni mentions the term maha-matra (officer-in-charge), which indicates that the early Satavahanas followed the Mauryan administrative model. C. Margabandhu theorised that the Satavahanas were called Andhras because they were natives of eastern Deccan (the Andhra region), although they first established their empire in western Deccan after having served as Mauryan subordinates. Himanshu Prabha Ray (1986) opposes this theory, stating that the Andhra was originally an ethnic term, and did not come to denote the geographical region of eastern Deccan until well after the Satavahana period. According to Vidya Dehejia, the writers of the Puranas (which could have been written after the Satavahana period) mistook the Satavahana presence in eastern Deccan as evidence for their origin in that region, and wrongly labelled them as "Andhra".

Puranas called the Satavahana kings as Andhrabhrityah. Andhra is both a tribal and a territorial name, the latter territorial denotation of present Telugu lands came into usage only well after the Satavahana period had ended, which meant that the term Andhra represented only the Andhra tribe (who had originated in North India along the Yamuna river banks as per Rigveda) and not the present Andhra region or its Telugu people. The term Andhrabhrityas (Andhra servants) may imply two things, one being that the Andhras were originally servants of the Mauryas or the Sungas. The other one, as per some scholars is that the expression is taken to indicate the servants of some other Andhra rulers. These scholars also suggest Kannada origin for the Satavahanas meaning that the dynasty originated in present-day Karnataka, and initially owed allegiance to some Andhra rulers. A Satavahana inscription found on a slab of the upper drum (medhi) of the Kanaganahalli mahastupa mentions year 16 of Vasisthiputra Sri Chimuka Satavahana's reign, which can be dated from ca. 110 BCE. V. S. Sukthankar theorised that the territorial division Satavahani-Satahani (Satavahanihara or Satahani-rattha), in present-day Bellary district, was the homeland of the Satavahana family. However, Dr. Gopalchari challenged Sukthankar's theory by pointing out that not a single inscription of the early Satavahanas is found in Bellary District and that the only Satavahana inscription in Bellary District was that of Pulumavi, who belongs to the later-phase of Satavahana history. A stupa in Kanaganahalli village of Karnataka, dated between the first century BCE and first century CE, features limestone panels depicting portraits of Chimuka (Simuka), Satakani (Satakarni) and other Satavahana rulers. As per historian Parmanand Gupta, in the medieval times, Srisailam region or the Sriparvata area was known as Kannadu and Kannavisaya which is the contracted form of Satakarninadu and Satakarnivisaya, which seem to be identical with the territorial indicator Satavahanihara of the Myakadoni inscription of Pulumayi or the Satavahaniratta of the Hirahadagalli grant consisting of the Ballari region indicated to be the original homeland of the Satavahanas as per another historian V. S. Sukthankar. Ptolemy (100-170 CE) mentions a Satavahana king Sire Polemaios, who is identified with Sri Pulumayi (or Pulumavi), whose name is derived from the Kannada word for Puli, meaning tiger. Some scholars indicate that the name Pulumayi is actually Kannada's 'Puli Maiyi' or 'One with the body of a tiger' indicating native Kannada origin for the Satavahanas.

Varna 

The varna of the dynasty is debated by modern scholars, who have variously argued for Shudra, Kshatriya, and Brahmana origins of the dynasty.

The Puranas call the founder of the Satavahana family a vṛṣala (Shudra or low-born).

The Nashik inscription of Gautami Balashri describes her son Gautamiputra Satakarni as eka-bamhana (Sanskrit: eka-brahmana). Some scholars, such as V.V. Mirashi, have interpreted the term as "sole Brahmana", and argued that Satavahanas were Brahmanas. Hem Chandra Raychaudhuri interprets the term as "unique Brahmana", and notes that the inscription also describes Gautamiputra as "the destroyer of the pride and conceit of Kshatriyas", which according to him strongly suggests that Gautamiputra claimed to be a Brahmana.

The critics of this theory point out that Gautamiputra's family had matrimonial relations with the non-Brahmana Shakas, and the Satavahanas could not have been Brahmanas because the same inscription also describes Gautamiputra as the one who stopped admixture of varnas (vinivatita chatu vana sankara). Historian V. Sundara Rama Sastry argues that the interpretation of the term "eka-bamhana" as "the only Brahmana" does not make sense as the king was obviously not the only member of his varna: instead, he interprets the term as an epithet indicating that the king "excelled even the Brahmans". Historian R. G. Bhandarkar interprets the term "the only protector" of the Brahmanas.

Some Jain works and the Dvātriṃśat-Puttalikā represent Shalivahana (whom some modern scholars identify as a Satavahana king) as of mixed Brahmana and Naga origin. Based on this, some scholars, such as D.C. Sircar, theorize that the Satavahanas were originally non-Brahmanas who started claiming Brahmana status after establishing matrimonial relations with some Brahmana families.

History 
Information about the Satavahanas comes from the Puranas, some Buddhist and Jain texts, the dynasty's inscriptions and coins, and foreign (Greek and Roman) accounts that focus on trade. The information provided by these sources is not sufficient to reconstruct the dynasty's history with absolute certainty. As a result, there are multiple theories about the Satavahana chronology.

Foundation 

Simuka is mentioned as the first king in a list of royals in a Satavahana inscription at Naneghat. The various Puranas state that the first king of the dynasty ruled for 23 years, and mention his name variously as Sishuka, Sindhuka, Chhismaka, Shipraka, etc. These are believed to be corrupted spellings of Simuka, resulting from copying and re-copying of manuscripts. Simuka cannot be dated with certainty based on available evidence. Based on the following theories, the beginning of the Satavahana rule is dated variously from 271 BCE to 30 BCE. According to the Puranas, the first Andhra king overthrew the Kanva rule. He is named as Balipuccha in some texts. D. C. Sircar dated this event to c. 30 BCE, a theory supported by many other scholars.

The Matsya Purana mentions that the Andhra dynasty ruled for around 450 years. As the Satavahana rule ended in the early 3rd century, the beginning of their rule can be dated to the 3rd century BCE. The Indica of Megasthenes (350 – 290 BCE) mentions a powerful tribe named "Andarae", whose king maintained an army of 100,000 infantry, 2,000 cavalry and 1,000 elephants. If Andarae is identified with the Andhras, this can be considered additional evidence of Satavahana rule starting in the 3rd century BCE. The Brahmanda Purana states that "the four Kanvas will rule the earth for 45 years; then (it) will again go to the Andhras". Based on this statement, the proponents of this theory argue that the Satavahana rule began immediately after the Maurya rule, followed by a Kanva interregnum, and then, a revival of the Satavahana rule. According to one version of the theory Simuka succeeded the Mauryans. A variation of the theory is that Simuka was the person who restored the Satavahana rule by overthrowing the Kanvas; the compiler of the Puranas confused him with the founder of the dynasty.

Most modern scholars believe that the Satavahana ruler began in the first century BCE and lasted until the second century CE. This theory is based on Puranic records as well as archaeological and numismatic evidence. The theory that dates their rule to an earlier period is now largely discredited because the various Puranas contradict each other, and are not fully supported by epigraphic or numismatic evidence.

The oldest Satavahana inscription is the one found on a slab of the upper drum (medhi) of the Kanaganahalli Great Stupa mentioning year 16 of Vasisthiputra Sri Chimuka Satavahana's reign, which can be dated from ca. 110 BCE.

On another stone slab at Kanaganahalli, the king is possibly shown together with a Nagaraja, and the inscription reads:

Early expansion 

Simuka was succeeded by his brother Kanha (also known as Krishna), who extended the kingdom up to Nashik in the west. His successor Satakarni I conquered western Malwa, Anupa (Narmada valley) and Vidarbha, taking advantage of the turmoil caused by Greek invasions of northern India. He performed Vedic sacrifices including Ashvamedha and Rajasuya. Instead of the Buddhists, he patronised Brahmins and donated a substantial amount of wealth to them. The Hathigumpha inscription of the Kalinga king Kharavela mentions a king named "Satakani" or "Satakamini", who some identify with Satakarni I. The inscription describes dispatching of an army and Kharavela's threat to a city. Since the inscription is only partially legible, different scholars interpret the events described in the inscription differently. According to R. D. Banerji and Sailendra Nath Sen, Kharavela sent out an army against Satakarni. According to Bhagwal Lal, Satakarni wanted to avoid an invasion of his kingdom by Kharavela. So, he sent horses, elephants, chariots and men to Kharavela as a tribute. According to Sudhakar Chattopadhyaya, Kharavela's army diverted its course after failing to advance against Satakarni. According to Alain Daniélou, Kharavela was friendly with Satakarni, and only crossed his kingdom without any clashes.

Satakarni's successor Satakarni II ruled for 56 years, during which he captured eastern Malwa from the Shungas. This allowed him access to the Buddhist site of Sanchi, in which he is credited with the building of the decorated gateways around the original Mauryan Empire and Sunga stupas. Satakarni II is known from a dedicatory inscription at Sanchi. He was succeeded by Lambodara. The coins of Lambodara's son and successor Apilaka have been found in eastern Madhya Pradesh. However, Andrew Ollett argues that there is only one Satakarni, as the alleged first Satakarni is assigned ten years, and the second, fifty years by other scholars, but the only dated inscription of this king is Candankheda seal from his reign's year 30, around 60 BCE, and he ruled ca. 88-42 BCE.

Art of Sanchi 
The Satavahanas contributed greatly to the embellishment of the Buddhist stupa of Sanchi. It was heavily repaired under King Satakarni II. The gateways and the balustrade were built after 70 BCE, and appear to have been commissioned by the Satavahanas.  An inscription on the Southern Gateway records that it was the work of Satakarni II's royal architect Ananda. An inscription records the gift of one of the top architraves of the Southern Gateway by the artisans of the Satavahana Emperor Satakarni:

First Western Satraps invasion under Nahapana 

Little is known about Apilaka's successors, except cryptic references to one Kuntala Satakarni. The next well-known ruler of the dynasty was Hāla, who composed Gaha Sattasai in Maharashtri Prakrit. Like Hala, his four successors also ruled for very short periods (a total of 12 years), indicating troubled times for the Satavahanas.

Epigraphic and numismatic evidence suggests that the Satavahanas earlier controlled the northern Deccan Plateau, the northern Konkan coastal plains, and the mountain passes connecting these two regions. During 15-40 CE, their northern neighbours - the Western Kshatrapas - extended their influence into these regions. The Western Kshatrapa ruler Nahapana is known to have ruled the former Satavahana territory, as attested by the inscriptions of his governor and son-in-law, Rishabhadatta.

First revival 

The Satavahana power was revived by Gautamiputra Satakarni, who is considered the greatest of the Satavahana rulers. Charles Higham dates his reign . S. Nagaraju dates it 106–130 CE, the new consensus is shared by Shailendra Bhandare, Akira Shimada, and Oskar von Hinuber, who regard Gautamiputra Satakarni's reign was ca. 60-85 CE, as it is evident from history that "Gautamiputra Saatakarni" in the year 78CE defeated Vikramaditya of Ujjain, which in turn was celebrated and named "Yug Aadi" means Beginning of New Era (New Year for Andhra, Karnataka, Maharashtra (Gudi padwa), Telangana states). Ever since these states people followed  Saatavaahana calendar. Andrew Ollett considers it as 60-84 CE. The king defeated by him appears to have been the Western Kshatrapa ruler Nahapana, as suggested by Nahapana's coins overstuck with names and titles of Gautamiputra. The Nashik prashasti inscription of Gautamiputra's mother Gautami Balashri, dated to the 20th year after his death, records his achievements. The most liberal interpretation of the inscription suggests that his kingdom extended from the present-day Rajasthan in the north to Krishna river in the south, and from Saurashtra in the west to Kalinga in the east. He assumed the titles Raja-Raja (King of Kings) and Maharaja (Great King), and was described as the Lord of Vindhya.

During the last years of his reign, his administration was apparently handled by his mother, which could have been a result of an illness or military preoccupation. According to the Nasik inscription made by his mother Gautami Balashri, he was the one ...

Gautamiputra was succeeded by his son Vasisthiputra Sri Pulamavi (or Pulumayi). According to Sailendra Nath Sen, Pulumavi ruled from 96 to 119 CE. According to Charles Higham, he ascended the throne around 110 CE, according to Shailendra Bhandare, Akira Shimada, and Oskar von Hinuber Vasisthiputra Sri Pulamavi ruled ca. 85-125 CE, and Andrew Ollett considers it to be ca. 84-119 CE. Pulumavi features in a large number of Satavahana inscriptions and his coins have been found distributed over a wide area. This indicates that he maintained Gautamiputra's territory, and ruled a prosperous kingdom. He is believed to have added the Bellary region to Satakarni's kingdom. His coins featuring ships with double mast have been found on the Coromandel Coast, indicating involvement in maritime trade and naval power. The old stupa at Amaravati was perhaps renovated during his reign. though recent scholarship tends to spread the dates of this wider.

Second Western Satraps invasion under Rudradaman I 

Pulumavi's successor was his brother Vashishtiputra Satakarni. According to S. N. Sen he ruled during 120–149 CE; according to Charles Higham, his regnal years spanned 138–145 CE. He entered into a marriage alliance with the Western Satraps, marrying the daughter of Rudradaman I.

The Junagadh inscription of Rudradaman I states that he defeated Satakarni, the lord of Dakshinapatha (Deccan), twice. It also states that he spared the life of the defeated ruler because of close relations:

According to D. R. Bhandarkar and Dineshchandra Sircar, the ruler defeated by Rudradaman was Gautamiputra Satakarni. However, E. J. Rapson believed that the defeated ruler was his son Vasishthiputra Pulumavi. Shailendra Nath Sen and Charles Higham believe that the defeated ruler was Vashishtiputra's successor Shivaskanda or Shiva Sri Pulumayi (or Pulumavi).

As a result of his victories, Rudradaman regained all the former territories previously held by Nahapana, except for the extreme south territories of Pune and Nasik. Satavahana dominions were limited to their original base in the Deccan and eastern central India around Amaravati.

Second revival 

Sri Yajna Sātakarni, the last person belonging to the main Satavahana dynastic line, briefly revived the Satavahana rule. According to S. N. Sen, he ruled during 170–199 CE. Charles Higham dates the end of his reign to 181 CE. His coins feature images of ships, which suggest naval and marine trade success. Wide distribution of his coins, and inscriptions at Nashik, Kanheri and Guntur indicate that his rule extended over both eastern and western parts of Deccan. He recovered much of the territory lost the Western Kshatrapas, and issued silver coinage, imitating them. During the last years of his reign, the Abhiras captured the northern parts of the kingdom, around Nashik region.

Decline 
After Yajna Satakarni, the dynasty was soon extinguished following the rise of its feudatories, perhaps on account of a decline in central power. On the other hand, the Western Satraps would continue to prosper for the next two centuries, until their extinction by the Gupta Empire. Yajna Sri was succeeded by Madhariputra Swami Isvarasena. The next king Vijaya ruled for 6 years. His son Vasishthiputra Sri Chadha Satakarni ruled for 10 years. Pulumavi IV, the last king of the main line, ruled until . During his reign, several Buddhist monuments were constructed at sites including Nagarjunakonda and Amaravati. Madhya Pradesh was also part of his kingdom.

After the death of Pulumavi IV, the Satavahana empire fragmented into five smaller kingdoms:

 Northern part, ruled by a collateral branch of the Satavahanas (which ended in early 4th century)
 Western part around Nashik, ruled by the Abhira dynasty
 Eastern part (Krishna-Guntur region), ruled by the Andhra Ikshvakus
 South-western parts (northern Karanataka), ruled by the Chutus of Banavasi
 South-eastern part, ruled by the Pallavas

Territorial extent 

The Satavahana territory included northern Deccan region, spanning the present-day Andhra Pradesh, Maharashtra and Telangana states. At times, their rule also extended to present-day Gujarat, Karnataka and Madhya Pradesh. The Nashik prashasti inscription issued by Gautami Balashri, the mother of Gautamiputra Satakarni, claims that her son ruled an extensive territory that stretched from Gujarat in the north to northern Karnataka in the south. It is not clear if Gautamiputra had effective control over these claimed territories. In any case, historical evidence suggests that his control over these territories did not last long. Moreover, this realm was not continuous: many areas in this region remained under the control of the hunter-gatherers and other tribal communities.

As per historian M. Govinda Pai, Ptolemy (100-170 CE) states that when Siro Polemaios (Vasishthiputra Sri Pulumayi) was ruling from his capital Paithan in the north (reign c. 85-125 CE), another Satavahana prince called Baleokouros or Baleokoura (Vilivayakura) was ruling from Hippokoura (Huvina Hipparagi) of Basavana Bagewadi taluk of Vijayapura district of present Karnataka in the south who was none other than his own son. Pai identifies this prince Vilivaya-kura as another form of Vilivaya Kumara (meaning the son of Vilivaya), and he goes on to prove that Vilivaya is indeed merely another rendering of Pulumayi which was transformed as per Prakrit rules, the spoken form of this language during that period, and due to common parlance. Thus, Vilivayakura means a son of Pulumayi who was ruling from Huvina Hipparagi in present Karnataka. Pai identifies all the 10 cities mentioned by Ptolemy as lying between the river Benda (or Binda) or Bhima river in the north and Banaouasei (Banavasi) in the south, viz. Nagarouris (Nagur), Tabaso (Tavasi), Inde (Indi), Tiripangalida (Gadhinglaj), Hippokoura (Huvina Hipparagi), Soubouttou (Savadi), Sirimalaga (Malkhed), Kalligeris (Kalkeri), Modogoulla (Mudgal) and Petirgala (Pattadakal), as being located in Northern Karnataka.

The Satavahana capital kept shifting with time. The Nashik inscription describes Gautamiputra as the lord of Benakataka, suggesting that this was the name of his capital. Ptolemy (2nd century CE) mentioned Pratishthana (modern Paithan) as the capital of Pulumavi. At other times, the Satavahana capitals included Dharanikota and Junnar. M. K. Dhavalikar theorised that the original Satavahana capital was located at Junnar, but had to be moved to Pratishthana because of Saka-Kushana incursions from the north-west.

Several Satavahana-era inscriptions record grants to religious monasteries. The settlements most frequently mentioned as the residences of donors in these inscriptions include the sea ports of Sopara, Kalyan, Bharuch, Kuda (unidentified), and Chaul. The most frequently mentioned inland settlements include Dhanyakatakam/Dharanikota, Junnar, Nashik, Paithan, and Karad.

Other important Satavahana sites in western Deccan include Govardhana, Nevasa, Ter, and Vadgaon-Madhavpur. The ones in eastern Deccan include Amaravati, Dhulikatta, Kotalingala and Peddabankur.

Administration 

The Satavahanas followed the administration guidelines of the Shastras. Their government was less top-heavy than that of the Mauryans, and featured several levels of feudatories:

 Rajan, the hereditary rulers
 Rajas, petty princes who struck coins in their own names
 Maharathis, hereditary lords who could grant villages in their own names and maintained matrimonial relations with the ruling family
 Mahabhojas
 Mahasenapati (civil administrator under Pulumavi II; governor of a janapada under Pulumavi IV)
 Mahatalavara ("great watchman")

The royal princes (kumaras) were appointed as viceroys of the provinces.

The  appears to have been the largest geographical subdivision of the Satavahana polity. Several inscriptions refer to  named after the governors appointed to rule them (e.g. Govardhanahara, Mamalahara, Satavanihara and Kapurahara). This suggests that the Satavahanas attempted to build a formal administrative and revenue collection structure.

The inscriptions of Gautamiputra Satakarni suggest the existence of a bureaucratic structure, although it is not certain how stable and effective this structure was. For example, two inscriptions from Nashik Cave 11 record donations of agricultural land to ascetic communities. They state that the ascetics would enjoy tax exemption and non-interference from the royal officials. The first inscription states that the grant was approved by Gautamiputra's minister Sivagupta on the king's verbal orders, and preserved by the "great lords". The second inscription records a grant by Gautamiputra and his mother, and mentions Syamaka as the minister of the Govardhana . It states that the charter was approved by a woman named Lota, who according to archaeologist James Burgess' interpretation, was the chief lady-in-waiting of Gautamiputra's mother.

The Satavahana-era inscriptions mention three types of settlements: nagara (city), nigama (market town) and gāma (village).

According to Sastri, "the Satavahanas were described as 'lords of the three oceans' and promoted overseas colonization and trade. Under them, Buddhist art attained the superb forms of beauty and elegance preserved to this day in the cave-temples of western India and the survivals from the stupa of Amaravati, Goli, Nagarjunikonda". This tradition was followed by successors of Satavahana in the eastern and western Deccan.

Economy 

The Satavahanas participated in (and benefited from) economic expansion through intensification of agriculture, increased production of other commodities, and trade within and beyond the Indian subcontinent.

During the Satavahana period, several large settlements emerged in the fertile areas, especially along the major rivers. The amount of land under agricultural use also expanded significantly, as a result of forest clearance and construction of irrigation reservoirs.

The exploitation of sites with mineral resources may have increased during the Satavahana period, leading to the emergence of new settlements in these areas. Such sites facilitated commerce and crafts (such as ceramic ware). The increased craft production during the Satavahana period is evident from archaeological discoveries at sites such as Kotalingala, as well as epigraphic references to artisans and guilds.

The Satavahanas controlled the Indian sea coast, and as a result, they dominated the growing Indian trade with the Roman Empire. The Periplus of the Erythraean Sea mentions two important Satavahana trade centres: Pratishthana and Tagara. Other important urban centres included Kondapur, Banavasi and Madhavpur. Nanaghat was the site of an important pass that linked the Satavahana capital Pratishthana to the sea.

Religion 

The Satavahanas were Hindus and claimed Brahmanical status, although they also made generous donations to Buddhist monasteries. The lay people in the Satavahana period perhaps generally did not exclusively support a particular religious group .

The Naneghat inscription of Nayanika, recorded on the walls of a cave, mentions that her husband Satakarni I performed several Vedic sacrifices, including ashvamedha (horse sacrifice), rajasuya (royal consecration), and agnyadheya (fire ceremony). The inscription also records substantial fees paid to Brahmin priests and attendees for these sacrifices. For example, 10,001 cows were granted for the Bhagala-Dasaratra sacrifice; and 24,400 coins were granted for another sacrifice, whose name is not clear.

A number of Buddhist monastic sites emerged in the Deccan region during the Satavahana period. However, the exact relations between these monasteries and the Satavahana government is not clear. The Pandavleni Caves inscription issued during the reign of Kanha states that the cave was excavated by maha-matra (officer-in-charge) of the shramanas (non-Vedic ascetics). Based on this, Sudhakar Chattopadhyaya concludes that Kanha favoured Buddhism, and had an administrative department dedicated to the welfare of Buddhist monks.

However, Carla M. Sinopoli notes that although there are some records of donations to the Buddhist monasteries by the Satavahana royals, the vast majority of the donations were made by the non-royals. The most common among these donors were merchants, and many of the monasteries were located along the important trade routes. The merchants probably donated to the monasteries, because these sites facilitated trade by serving as rest houses, and possibly by directly participating in the trade. The monasteries appear to have been an important venue for displaying charitable donations, including the donations made to non-Buddhists (especially Brahmins).

Language 

Most of the Satavahana inscriptions and coin legends are in a Middle Indo-Aryan language. This language has been termed "Prakrit" by some modern scholars, but this terminology can be considered correct only if the term "Prakrit" is defined broadly to include every Middle Indo-Aryan language that is "not exactly Sanskrit". The language of the inscriptions is actually closer to Sanskrit than to the literary Prakrit used in the Gaha Sattasai anthology attributed to the Satavahana king Hala.

According to Gunadya, besides Sanskrit and Prakrit there is another language called 'Desi' which may mean the native language or the language of common man. Commenting on the Desi language Dr.D.C.Sircar remarks "It was apparently Early Telugu which was in older times closer to Tamil than it is now was the mother tongue of the common people". Later Satavahana kings like Gauthamiputra Satakarni, Vastistiputra pulamovi and Yajna Satakarni had their names in two languages i.e.; Prakrit and Desi, a native language.

The Satvahanas also used Sanskrit in political inscriptions, but rarely. A fragmentary inscription found close to the Nashik prashasti of Gautamiputra Satakarni uses Sanskrit verses in vasanta-tilaka metre to describe a deceased king (probably Gautamiputra). A Sanskrit inscription found at Sannati probably refers to Gautamiputra Shri Satakarni, one of whose coins also features a Sanskrit legend.

The Satavahanas also issued bilingual coins featuring Middle Indo-Aryan language on one side, and Desi language on the other side.

Inscriptions 

Several Brahmi script inscriptions are available from the Satavahana period, but most of these record donations to Buddhist institutions by individuals, and do not provide much information about the dynasty. The inscriptions issued by the Satavahana royals themselves also primarily concern religious donations, although some of them provide some information about the rulers and the imperial structure.

The earliest extant Satavahana inscription is from Nashik Cave 19, which states that the cave was commissioned by Mahamatra Saman of Nashik during the reign of king Kanha.

At Naneghat, an inscription issued by Nayanika, the widow of Satakarni I, has been found. It records Nayanika's lineage and mentions the Vedic sacrifices performed by the royal family. Another inscription at Naneghat comprises names of Satavahana royals, appearing as labels over their bas-relief portraits. The portraits are now completely eroded, but the inscription is believed to be contemporary to Nayanika's inscription on a paleographic basis.

The next oldest Satavahana-era inscription appears on a sculpted gateway element of Stupa 1 at Sanchi. It states that the element was donated by Ananda, who was the son of Siri Satakarni's foreman of artisans. This inscription is probably from the reign of Satakarni II.

Coinage 

The Satavahanas were the earliest Indian rulers to issue their own coins with portraits of their rulers, starting with king Gautamiputra Satakarni, a practice derived from that of the Western Kshatrapas he defeated. The Western Satraps themselves had been following the features of the coins of the Indo-Greek kings to the northwest.

Thousands of lead, copper and potin Satavahana coins have been discovered in the Deccan region; a few gold and silver coins are also available. These coins do not feature uniform design or size, and suggest that multiple minting locations existed within the Satavahana territory, leading to regional differences in coinage.

The coin legends of the Satavahanas, in all areas and all periods, used a Prakrit dialect without exception. In addition, some reverse coin legends are in Dravidian (similar to the Tamil and Telugu languages), in the Dravidian script (similar to the Brahmi script apart from a few variations).

Several coins carry titles or matronyms that were common to multiple rulers (e.g. Satavahana, Satakarni, and Pulumavi), so the number of rulers attested by coinage cannot be determined with certainty. The names of 16 to 20 rulers appear on the various coins. Some of these rulers appear to be local elites rather than the Satavahana monarchs.

The Satavahana coins give unique indications as to their chronology, language, and even facial features (curly hair, long ears and strong lips). They issued mainly lead and copper coins; their portrait-style silver coins were usually struck over coins of the Western Kshatrapa kings. The Satavahana coins also display various traditional symbols, such as elephants, lions, horses and chaityas (stupas), as well as the "Ujjain symbol", a cross with four circles at the end.

Other examples

Cultural achievements 

The Satavahanas patronised the Prakrit language instead of Sanskrit. The Satavahana king Hāla is famous for compiling the collection of Maharashtri poems known as the Gaha Sattasai, although from linguistic evidence it seems that the work now extant must have been re-edited in the succeeding century or two. Through this book, it was evident that agriculture was the main means of livelihood. Also many sorts of superstitions had prevailed. Additionally, Gunadhya, the minister of Hala, was the author of Brihatkatha.

Sculptures 
Madhukar Keshav Dhavalikar writes that "The Satavahana sculptures unfortunately has never been recognized as an independent school in spite of the fact it has its own distinctive characteristic features. The earliest in point of time is that in the Bhaja Vihara cave which marks the beginning of sculptural art in the Satavahana dominion around 200BC. It is profusely decorated with carvings, and even pillars have a lotus capital crowned with sphinx-like mythic animals." Dhavalikar also writes that in Chankama "the panel occurring on the west pillar of Northern Gateway portrays a very important event in Buddha's life. It depicts votaries, two each on either side of what looks like a ladder which actually is the promenade which Buddha is supposed to have walked. It is said that Buddha, after attaining Enlightment, spent four weeks near the Bodhi tree. Of these, the third week he spent walking along the promenade (chankama) to and fro."

Along with some of the above major Satavahana sculptures some more sculptures existed—namely, Dvarapala, Gajalaksmi, Shalabhanjikas, Royal Procession, Decorative pillar, etc.

Bronze 

Several metal figurines are found that could be attributed to the Satavahanas. A hoard of unique bronze objects were also found from Bramhapuri. Numerous articles obtained from there were Indian but also reflected Roman and Italian influence. A small statue of Poseidon, wine jugs, and a plaque depicting Perseus and Andromeda were also obtained from the house from where the objects were found. The fine elephant in the Ashmolean Museum, the Yaksi image in the British Museum, and the cornucopia found in Posheri, kept at Chhatrapati Shivaji Maharaj Vastu Sangrahalaya can also be attributed to the Satavahana period.

Architecture 
The sculptures of the Amaravati Stupa and the wider Amaravati style represent the architectural development of the Satavahana periods. They built Buddhist stupas in Amravati (95 feet high). They also constructed a large number of stupas at Goli, Jaggiahpeta, Gantasala, Amravati Bhattiprolu, and Shri Parvatam. Caves IX and X, containing Ajanta paintings, were patronised by Satavahana, and the painting throughout the caves appear to have started with them. Ashokan Stupas were enlarged, the earlier bricks and wood works being replaced with stone works. The most famous of these monuments are the stupas, the most famous among them being the Amravati Stupa and the Nagarjunakonda Stupa.

Paintings 
The Satavahana paintings are the earliest surviving specimens—excluding prehistoric rock art—in India, and they are to be found only at the Ajanta Caves. There were two phases of artistic activity of Ajanta: the first occurring in the 2nd to 1st centuries BC, when Hinayana caves were excavated during Satavahana rule; the later in the second half of the 5th century under the Vakatakas. Vagaries of nature and some vandalism have taken a heavy toll on the Ajanta Caves. Only a few fragments related to the Satavahanas have survived in Caves No. 9 and 10, both of which are chaitya-grihas with stupas.

The most important surviving painting of the Satavahana period at Ajanta is the Chhadanta Jataka in Cave No. 10, but that, too, is only fragmentary. It is a painting of an elephant named Bodhisattva with six tusks, related to a mythological story. The human figures, both male and female, are typically Satavahanas, almost identical with their counterparts on the Sanchi Gateways so far as their physiognomy, costumes, and jewellery are concerned. The only difference is that the Sanchi figures have shed some of their weight.

Art of Amaravati 

The Satavahana rulers are also remarkable for their contributions to Buddhist art and architecture. They built great stupas in the Krishna River Valley, including the stupa at Amaravati in Andhra Pradesh. The stupas were decorated in marble slabs and sculpted with subjects including scenes from the life of the Buddha, portrayed in a characteristic slim and elegant style. The regional Amaravati style of sculpture also influenced the sculpture of Southeast Asia.

List of rulers 

Multiple Puranas contain chronology of Satavahana kings. However, there are inconsistencies among the various Puranas over the number of kings in the dynasty, the names of the kings, and the length of their rule. In addition, some of the kings listed in the Puranas are not attested via archaeological and numismatic evidence. Similarly, there are some kings known from coins and inscriptions, whose names are not found in the Puranic lists.

The reconstructions of the Satavahana kings by historians fall into two categories. According to the first one, 30 Satavahana kings ruled for around 450 years, starting from Simuka's rule immediately after the fall of the Mauryan empire. This view relies heavily on the Puranas, and is now largely discredited. According to the second (and more widely accepted) category of reconstructions, the Satavahana rule started in around first century BCE. The chronologies in this category contain a smaller number of kings, and combine Puranic records with archaeological, numismatic and textual evidence.

Because of uncertainty regarding the establishment date of the Satavahana kingdom, it is difficult to give absolute dates for the reigns of the Satavahana kings. Therefore, many modern scholars do not assign absolute dates to the reigns of the historically attested Satavahana kings, and those who do vary greatly with each other.

List based on Archeology 
Himanshu Prabha Ray provides the following chronology, based on archaeological and numismatic evidence:
 Simuka (before 100 BCE)
 Kanha (100–70 BCE)
 Satakarni I (70–60 BCE)
 Satakarni II (50–25 BCE)
 Kshatrapa interregnum with vassal Satavahana kings like Hāla
 Nahapana (54-100 CE)
 Gautamiputra Satakarni (86–110 CE)
 Pulumavi (110–138 CE)
 Vashishtiputra Satakarni (138–145 CE)
 Shiva Shri Pulumavi (145–152 CE)
 Shiva Skanda Satakarni (145–152 CE)
 Yajna Shri Satakarni (152–181 CE)
 Vijaya Satakarni
 Regional rulers of south-eastern Deccan:
 Chandra Shri
 Pulumavi II
 Abhira Isvarasena
 Madhariputra Sakasena
 Haritiputra Satakarni

Puranic lists 

The various Puranas give different lists of the Satavahana rulers. The Matsya Purana states that 30 Andhra kings ruled for 460 years, but some of its manuscripts name only 19 kings whose reigns add up to 448.5 years. The Vayu Purana also mentions that there were 30 Andhra kings, but its various manuscripts name only 17, 18, and 19 kings respectively; the reigns add up to 272.5, 300, and 411 years respectively. Many of these kings are not attested by historical evidence. On the other hand, some Satavahana kings attested by numismatic evidence (such as Rudra Satakarni) are not mentioned in the Puranas at all.

Different scholars have explained these anomalies in different ways. Scholars such as R. G. Bhandarkar, D. C. Sircar and H. C. Raychaudhuri theorised that the Vayu Purana mentions only the main imperial branch of the dynasty, while the Matsya Purana puts together princes of all its branches.

The names of the Andhra kings (in IAST), as mentioned in the various Puranas, are given below. These names vary across different manuscripts of the same Puranas, and some names are missing in some of the manuscripts. The list given below for each Purana contains the most exhaustive version. In the Puranas, Krishna (IAST: Kṛṣṇa) is described as brother of the first king, who overthrew the Kanva king Susharman. All other kings are described as sons of their predecessors. The first king of the Andhra-Bhrityas is also known as Shudraka or Suraka in the Kumarika Khanda  of Skanda Purana (not present in the table below).

Purana-based lists 

S. Nagaraju relies on the Puranic lists of 30 kings, and gives the following regnal dates:

Towards a Mid-Chronology 

Apart from the two traditional views (long and short chronologies) there is another kind of analysis pointing out to a "Mid-Chronology", as it was already proposed by Dr. Dehejia and others, and particularly most recently by Shailendra Bhandare, who regards Satavahana's rule extended more than three centuries (c. 150 BCE to 250 CE) with the flourish of trans-national trade, urbanism and monumental architecture in South India.

Bhandare regards Simuka to have ruled since around 160-150 BCE and that this date would still fit in well with Pargiter's 460 years to the Satavahanas, as it would fix the end of the dynasty around 300 CE, not too far from the mid-3rd century as consensus approximately lies. Regarding Siri Satakani and his wife Naganika, Bhandhare considers their rule to have been somewhere around 110 +/- 20 BCE.

Bhandare also suggests the following sequence of reigns, based on his analysis of Satavahana coinage:

 Gautamiputa Satakani (ca. 60-85 CE)
 Vasithiputa Siri Pulumayi (ca. 85-125 CE)
 Vasithiputa Siri Satakani (ca. 125-152 CE)
 Vasithiputa Siva Siri Pulumayi (ca. 152-160 CE)
 Vasithiputa Siri Khada Satakani (ca. 160-165 CE)
 Vasithiputa Vijaya Satakani (ca. 165-170 CE)
 Siri Yaña Satakani (ca. 170-200 CE)
 Gotamiputa Siri Cada (ca. 200-215 CE)
 Gotamiputa Siri Vijaya Satakani (ca. 215-225 CE)

On the other hand, based to a large degree on Shailendra Bhandare's work, with slight corrections, Andrew Ollett (2017) mentions the following reigns for the whole Satavahana dynasty:

 Vasisthiputra Sri Chimuka Satavahana (ca. 120-96 BCE)
 Krsna (ca. 96-88 BCE) 
 Sri Satakarni (ca. 88-42 BCE)
 Sakti 
 Mantalaka
 Sundara
 Gautamiputra Siva Satakarni (?-60 CE)
 Gautamiputra Sri Satakarni (ca. 60-84 CE)
 Vasisthiputra Sri Pulumavi (ca. 84-119 CE)
 Vasisthiputra Sri Satakarni (ca. 119-148 CE)
 Vasisthiputra Sivasri Pulumavi (ca. 148-156 CE)
 Vasisthiputra Sriskanda Satakarni (ca. 156-170 CE)
 Gautamiputra Sriyajña Satakarni (ca. 171-199 CE)
 Gautamiputra Srivijaya Satakarni (ca. 200-205 CE)
 Vasisthiputra Sricanda Satakarni (ca. 206-220 CE)
 Mathariputra Sri Pulumavi (ca. 220-230 CE)

See also 
 Magadha
 History of India
 History of Hinduism
 List of Indian monarchs
 List of wars involving India

References

Citations

Sources

External links 
 

 
States and territories disestablished in the 3rd century
Empires and kingdoms of India
History of Andhra Pradesh
History of Telangana
History of Maharashtra
History of Amaravati